Ibaji is a Local Government Area in Kogi State, Nigeria in the south of the state separated from Edo State to the west by the Niger River, and bordering Delta State in the south. Its headquarters are in the town of Onyedega on the Niger River in the northwest of the area at.

The northeasterly line of equal latitude and longitude passes through the LGA. 
 
It has an area of 1,377 km and a population of 128,129 at the 2006 census.

The postal code of the area is 271.

References

Local Government Areas in Kogi State